Charles William Shipp (December 3, 1913 – March 21, 1988) was an American professional basketball player and coach.

A 6'1" guard-forward, Shipp attended Cathedral High School in Indianapolis, where he led the Irish to the National Catholic Championship in 1933. Shipp played thirteen seasons (1937–1950) in the NBL and NBA as a member of the Akron Wingfoots, Oshkosh All-Stars, Fort Wayne Zollner Pistons, Anderson Packers, and Waterloo Hawks. During the 1949-50 NBA season he served as a player-coach for the Waterloo Hawks, posting an 8-27 record.  He made 5 All-NBL 1st teams (1937–38, 1939–43) and 2 All-NBL 2nd teams (1938–39, and 1943–44).

References

1913 births
1988 deaths
American men's basketball coaches
American men's basketball players
Anderson Packers players
Basketball coaches from Indiana
Basketball players from Indianapolis
Catholic University Cardinals men's basketball players
Fort Wayne Zollner Pistons players
Forwards (basketball)
Guards (basketball)
Oshkosh All-Stars players
Player-coaches
Waterloo Hawks coaches
Waterloo Hawks players